Alexander John Hunt (born 29 May 2000) is an English professional footballer who plays as a midfielder for EFL League Two club Grimsby Town.

Career

Sheffield Wednesday
Alex Hunt joined the Owls Academy at the age of seven where he would go on to become the club captain of the under-18s. He signed his first professional contract with the Owls in February 2018 as well as being nominated for the LFE Apprentice of the Year award in the same year, where he was eventually beaten by Ryan Sessegnon. He made his first team debut in the first round of the EFL Cup against Sunderland on 16 August 2018. On the 17 September 2019, Alex signed a new 2-year contract at Sheffield Wednesday taking him until the end of the 20–21 season. At the end of the 20–21 season, the club would activate a one-year extension to his contract.

On 12 August 2021, he joined Grimsby Town on loan, initially until January 2022. He made his debut on the opening day of the 21/22 season, starting the game against Weymouth. He scored his first professional goal from a direct free-kick in stoppage time to win 3 points against Barnet. Upon his return from his loan spell, he would sign a new 18 month contract with The Owls, keeping him at the club until the summer of 2023. A few days later on 17 January 2022, he would join Oldham Athletic on loan until the end of the season. He would make his debut against Harrogate Town where they lost 3-0.

Grimsby Town
On 1 September 2022, Hunt re-joined Grimsby Town on a three-year deal.

Career statistics

References

2000 births
Living people
English footballers
Association football midfielders
Sheffield Wednesday F.C. players
Grimsby Town F.C. players
Oldham Athletic A.F.C. players
English Football League players